The  2021 Rising Phoenix World Championships was a professional bodybuilding competition for women that was held in conjunction with Arizona Women's Pro and the NPC Wings of Strength Arizona Women's Extravaganza. It was held on 11 September 2021 at the Talking Stick Resort in Scottsdale, Arizona, United States of America. It was the 7th Rising Phoenix World Championships to be held.

Results

Scorecard
* All Ties are broke by relative placing

Best intro video award
 1st - LaDawn McDay
 2nd - Janeen Lankowski
 3rd - Nicole Chartrand

Best poser award
 1st - Mona Poursaleh
 2nd - Janeen Lankowski
 3rd - MayLa Ash

Most muscular award
 Irene Andersen

Notable events
 This was Andrea Shaw's 2nd Ms. Rising Phoenix title win.
Like the 2020 Rising Phoenix World Championships, there was a severe lack of non-American residential competitors due to COVID-19 travel restrictions.

Prize money
Best video award
 3rd - $2,000
 2nd - $3,000
 1st - $5,000
 Total - $10,000

Best poser award
 3rd - $2,000
 2nd - $3,000
 1st - $5,000
 Total - $10,000

Most muscular award
 $7,000

Ms. Rising Phoenix
 5th - $5,000
 4th - $7,500
 3rd - $12,500
 2nd - $25,000
 1st - $50,000 & American prize vehicle
 Total - $100,000 & American prize vehicle

Total overall - $120,000 & American prize vehicle

Official competitors list

 Irene Anderson
 MayLa Ash
 Reshanna Bosewell
 Nicki Chartrand
 Asha Hadley
 Monique Jones
 Natalia Kovaleva
 Janeen Lankowski
 Silvia Matta
 Kristina Mendoza
 Mona Poursaleh
 Angela Rayburn
 Virginia Sanchez
 Andrea Shaw
 Helle Trevino
 Tina Williams
 Aleesha Young
 Sandra Hewins

External links 
 Official homepage

References

Rising Phoenix World Championships
Wings of Strength
History of female bodybuilding
Female professional bodybuilding competitions